The Swan 68 was designed by German Frers and built by Nautor's Swan and first launched in 1991.

External links
 Nautor Swan
 German Frers Official Website

References

Sailing yachts
Keelboats
1990s sailboat type designs
Sailboat types built by Nautor Swan